In writing, a space is a blank area that separates words, sentences, syllables (in syllabification) and other written or printed glyphs (characters). Conventions for spacing vary among languages, and in some languages the spacing rules are complex. Inter-word spaces ease the reader's task of identifying words, and avoid outright ambiguities such as "now here" vs. "nowhere". They also provide convenient guides for where a human or program may start new lines.

Typesetting can use spaces of varying widths, just as it can use graphic characters of varying widths. Unlike graphic characters, typeset spaces are commonly stretched in order to align text. The typewriter, on the other hand, typically has only one width for all characters, including spaces. Following widespread acceptance of the typewriter, some typewriter conventions influenced typography and the design of printed works.

Computer representation of text facilitates getting around mechanical and physical limitations such as character widths in at least two ways:

 Character encodings such as Unicode provide spaces of several widths, which are encoded using distinct numeric code points. For example, Unicode U+20 is the "normal" space character, but U+A0 adds the meaning that a new line should not be started there, while U+2003 represents a space with a fixed width of one em. Collectively, such characters are called Whitespace characters.

 Formatting and drawing languages and software commonly provide much more flexibility in spacing. For example, SVG, PostScript, and countless other languages enable drawing characters at specific (x,y) coordinates on a screen or page. By drawing each word at a specific starting coordinate, such programs need not "draw" spaces at all (this can lead to difficulties in extracting the correct text back out). Similarly, word processors can "fully justify" text, stretching inter-word spaces to make all lines the same length (as can mechanical Linotype machines). Precision is limited by physical capabilities of output devices.

Use in natural languages

Between words

Modern English uses a space to separate words, but not all languages follow this practice. Spaces were not used to separate words in Latin until roughly 600–800 AD. Ancient Hebrew and Arabic did use spaces partly to compensate in clarity for the lack of vowels.

Word spacing was later used by Irish and Anglo-Saxon scribes, beginning after the creation of the Carolingian minuscule by Alcuin of York and the scribes' adoption of it. The modern space originated here and then spread to the rest of the world. Indeed, the actions of these Irish and Anglo-Saxon scribes marked the dramatic shift for reading between antiquity and the modern period. Spacing would become standard in Renaissance Italy and France, and then Byzantium by the end of the 16th century; then entering into the Slavic languages in Cyrillic in the 17th century, and only in modern times entering modern Sanskrit.

CJK languages do not use spaces when dealing with text containing mostly Chinese characters and kana. In Japanese, spaces may occasionally be used to separate people's family names from given names, to denote omitted particles (especially the topic particle wa), and for certain literary or artistic effects. Modern Korean, however, has spaces as an essential part of its writing system (because of Western influence), given the phonetic nature of the hangul script that requires word dividers to avoid ambiguity, as opposed to Chinese characters which are mostly very distinguishable from each other.

Runic texts use either an interpunct-like or a colon-like punctuation mark to separate words.

Between sentences

Languages with a Latin-derived alphabet have used various methods of sentence spacing since the advent of movable type in the 15th century.

 One space (some times called French spacing, q.v.). This is a common convention in most countries that use the ISO basic Latin alphabet for published and final written work, as well as digital (World Wide Web) media. Web browsers usually do not differentiate between single and multiple spaces in source code when displaying text, unless the text is given a "white-space" CSS attribute. Without this being set, collapsing strings of spaces to a single space allow HTML source code to be spaced in a more machine-readable way, at the expense of control over the spacing of the rendered page.
 Double space (English spacing). It is sometimes claimed that this convention stems from the use of the monospaced font on typewriters. However, instructions to use more spacing between sentences than words date back centuries, and two spaces on a typewriter was the closest approximation to typesetters' previous rules aimed at improving readability. Wider spacing continued to be used by both typesetters and typists until the Second World War, after which typesetters gradually transitioned to word spacing between sentences in published print, while typists continued the practice of using two spaces.
 One widened space, typically one-and-a-third to slightly less than twice as wide as a word space. This spacing was sometimes used in typesetting before the 19th century. It has also been used in other non-typewriter typesetting systems such as the Linotype machine and the TeX system. Modern computer-based digital fonts can adjust the spacing after terminal punctuation as well, creating a space slightly wider than a standard word space.

There has been some controversy regarding the proper amount of sentence spacing in typeset material. The Elements of Typographic Style states that only a single word space is required for sentence spacing.  Psychological studies suggest "readers benefit from having two spaces after periods."

Unit symbols and numbers

The International System of Units (SI) prescribes inserting a space between a number and a unit of measurement (the space being regarded as an implied multiplication sign) but never between a prefix and a base unit; a space (or a multiplication dot) should also be used between units in compound units.

 , not  or 
 20 kN m or 20 kN⋅m, not  or 
 π/2 rad, not  or 

The only exception to this rule is the traditional symbolic notation of angles: degree (e.g., 30°), minute of arc (e.g., 22′), and second of arc (e.g., 8″).

The SI also prescribes the use of a space (often typographically a thin space) as a thousands separator where required. Both the point and the comma are reserved as decimal markers.

 1 000 000 000 000  (thin space) or 1000000 not 1,000,000 or 1.000.000
 1 000 000 000 000 (regular space which is significantly wider)

Sometimes a narrow non-breaking space or non-breaking space, respectively, is recommended (as in, for example, IEEE Standards and IEC standards) to avoid the separation of units and values or parts of compounds units, due to automatic line wrap and word wrap.

Encoding
 Note: The above representation of a regular space is replaced with a non-breaking space for visibility.

In URLs, spaces are percent encoded with its ASCII/UTF-8 representation %20.

Types of spaces 
 Figure space
 Non-breaking space
 Paren space
 Thin space
 Visible space
 
 Zero-width space

See also 
 Em (typography)
 En (typography)
 Halfwidth and fullwidth forms
 Internal field separator
 Sentence spacing in digital media
 Underscore
 Whitespace character

References

Further reading
 

Control characters
Typography
Whitespace
Writing